Kim Min-sik may refer to:

Kim Min-sik (footballer)
Kim Min-sik (baseball)